Charles Hackett (November 4, 1889 – January 1, 1942) sometimes referred to as Carlo Hackett, was an American tenor.

Biography
He was born on November 4, 1889 in Worcester, Massachusetts.

Hackett studied first at the New England Conservatory in Boston with Arthur J. Hubbard, and later with Vincenzo Lombardi in Florence. He made his stage debut in Genoa, as Wilhelm Meister in Mignon, in 1914.

He sang in Italy and South America, before making his debut at the Metropolitan Opera on January 31, 1919, as Almaviva. He appeared there for three seasons, also as Lindoro, Roméo, Il duca di Mantova, Alfredo, Rodolfo, Pinkerton, Wilhelm Meister, Cavaradossi, Don Ottavio, Vincent and Des Grieux. He also sang at the Lyric Opera of Chicago from 1923 until 1934. He returned to the Metropolitan on February 3, 1934 as Roméo, and performed there for another five years.
Hackett made a number of recordings for Edison and Columbia, notably duets with Maria Barrientos and Rosa Ponselle, in which one can appreciate a singer with a fine technique and a certain elegance.

He died on New Year's Day, January 1, 1942 in Manhattan, New York City

Sources
 The Metropolitan Opera Encyclopedia, edited by David Hamilton, (Simon & Schuster, New York, 1987) 
  Metropolitan Opera Database

External links
 Charles Hackett recordings at the Discography of American Historical Recordings.
History of the Tenor – Sound Clips and Narration

1889 births
1942 deaths
American operatic tenors
Singers from Massachusetts
People from Worcester, Massachusetts
20th-century American male opera singers